Vojtěch Polák (born June 27, 1985 in Ostrov) is a Czech professional ice hockey left wing who is currently playing with Cracovia Krakow in the Polska Hokej Liga. 

Polak most recently iced with Sheffield Steelers of the UK Elite Ice Hockey League (EIHL). During the 2005–2006 season, he played significant time with the Iowa Stars, the American Hockey League affiliate of the Stars.

Playing career
From the 2000–2001 season to the 2004–2005 season, Polák would spend his time in the Czech Extraliga. A vast majority of his games played with HC Energie Karlovy Vary, though he would also play for HC Dukla Jihlava and a single game for HC Sparta Praha. In the 2003 NHL Entry Draft, the Stars drafted him in the second round with the 36th overall pick.

In 2005, Polák played his first professional game in North America with the Iowa Stars, scoring what would be his first of 12 goals and 34 points with the team. After an impressive preseason with the Stars in September, he made his NHL debut on October 22 against the Calgary Flames. He would dress for three games with the Stars during the 2005–2006 season, going scoreless.

International play
Polák represented the Czech Republic at the 2004 World Junior Ice Hockey Championships.

Career statistics

Regular season and playoffs

International

References

External links

1985 births
Living people
Admiral Vladivostok players
AIK IF players
HSC Csíkszereda players
Czech ice hockey left wingers
Dallas Stars draft picks
Dallas Stars players
HC Davos players
Dinamo Riga players
HPK players
Ilves players
Iowa Stars players
HC Karlovy Vary players
MKS Cracovia (ice hockey) players
People from Ostrov (Karlovy Vary District)
EHC Kloten players
HC Oceláři Třinec players
Piráti Chomutov players
SaiPa players
SCL Tigers players
Severstal Cherepovets players
Sheffield Steelers players
HC Sparta Praha players
HC Yugra players
Sportspeople from the Karlovy Vary Region
Czech expatriate ice hockey people
Czech expatriate sportspeople in Romania
Expatriate ice hockey players in Romania
Czech expatriate sportspeople in England
Expatriate ice hockey players in England
Czech expatriate sportspeople in Poland
Expatriate ice hockey players in Poland
Czech expatriate ice hockey players in Russia
Czech expatriate ice hockey players in the United States
Czech expatriate sportspeople in Latvia
Expatriate ice hockey players in Latvia
Czech expatriate ice hockey players in Finland
Czech expatriate ice hockey players in Sweden